RFA Olwen (A122) was an Ol-class "fast fleet tanker" of the Royal Fleet Auxiliary.

The lead ship of her class, and launched in 1964 as RFA Olynthus, the second ship to bear this name, she was renamed Olwen in 1967 to avoid confusion with HMS Olympus.

Operational history

1970
In November and December 1970 Olwen was involved in Operation Burlap giving humanitarian assistance to East Pakistan after a cyclone caused extensive damage and flooding.

1973
In the Second Cod War, Olwen supported Royal Navy ships three times.

Decommissioning
She was decommissioned in 1999 and laid up at Portsmouth, before being broken up at Alang, India in 2001.

References

 O Class Fleet Replenishment Tankers

Ol-class tankers (1965)
1964 ships